Huseyn Rahimli (born 10 June 1995) is an Azerbaijani Paralympic judoka. He won the gold medal in the men's 81 kg event at the 2020 Summer Paralympics held in Tokyo, Japan.

References

External links

 

Living people
1995 births
Azerbaijani male judoka
Paralympic judoka of Azerbaijan
Paralympic gold medalists for Azerbaijan
Paralympic medalists in judo
Judoka at the 2020 Summer Paralympics
Medalists at the 2020 Summer Paralympics
Place of birth missing (living people)
21st-century Azerbaijani people